is a series of science fiction light novels, running from 1992 to 1999, by Japanese author Hajime Kanzaka. It was later adapted into a 26-episode anime television series by E&G Films that ran from April 3rd to September 25th, 1998. The series aired on TV Tokyo in the same time slot in which the anime adaptation of Kanzaka's previous work Slayers had previously been shown.

The anime is known as "Universe Police" in China and Hong Kong.

Plot
In Slayers, it was mentioned that the main characters of that series live on a world that is one of the four created by the mother of all creation, called the Lord of Nightmares. This world was known as the Red World. Lost Universe, however, takes place in a different world, known as the Black World. Whereas the demi gods of the various worlds, such as Ruby-Eye Shabranigdo and Dark Star Dugradigdo had physical presence in that world, they appear in the Black World as "Lost Ships," intelligent space ships of unknown origin that have powerful or somewhat divine powers with more advanced technology than any other device in the universe. 

Their rarity and superiority has sparked suggestions that they have been made by an advanced ancient alien civilization or come from the beginning of the universe itself. Being a central part to the plot, the "Lost Ships" are intelligent beings with different loyalties and even their own agenda. Kain Blueriver, a "trouble contractor," inherits a "Lost Ship" from his grandmother and from there, he and his sidekick Milly, together with Canal, the ship's computer, journey to find a source of the evil that threatens the universe.

Characters
 

 is an intergalactic trouble-Contractor. He is a tough and reckless adventurer who captains Sword-Breaker, the legendary lost space ship from an ancient civilization. He acquired his spaceship from his grandmother and constantly recites quotes of her. A free spirit, he keeps an open mind whatever the situation. Ever the optimist, he is always confident he will prevail over whatever troubles await him. His motto is "carry out any difficult assignment to the end!" Kain is the master of the Psi-Blade, a weapon of psi energy, requiring tremendous mental strength. He wears a black cloak, likes his grandmother.

, is a happy-go-lucky girl whose catchphrase is that she aspires to be the "best in the universe." She joins Kain on their space adventures as an assistant and sometimes private detective. She has very basic detecting skills like opening a locked door with her hair pin. At work, she is indeed the best shot in the universe, but at home on Sword-Breaker is another matter. Providing a bit of comedy, she routinely blows up the kitchen, but somehow the meals turn out delicious.

 

 is a female human-like hologram that serves as the Sword-Breaker ship's computer. She has green hair styled in two long braids. She has a distinctive personality, emotions and reasoning abilities. Her usual form is a teenage girl, but if necessary, she can morph her form into a baby, a noble lady or other objects; whatever is needed to help Kain in his missions. Her motto is "carry out any difficult assignment to the end, as long as it shows a profit!" In this respect she is much like Lina Inverse from the series Slayers, with whom she shares a voice actress. Canal's mind functions as a computer, and she is very practical, analytical and logical. On the other hand, she sometimes shows her emotions when she teases Kain for his mistakes or has a quarrel with Millie. She is a bit selfish, doing a lot of negative actions for the Sword-Breaker owner (Kain Blueriver), like turning off Life System only for getting a job that Kain did not want.

 

He is a handsome and smart police inspector of Interstellar Police. Kain has a sort of inescapable "give-and-take" relationship with this young inspector. He often contacts the crew of the Sword-Breaker with mission requests that are not always requests.

 

The secretary of Raily Claymore, Nina is so deeply in love with Raily that she is fascinated by his gaze and forgets what she is doing. Two running gags in the series focus on her accidentally spilling coffee on Raily, and shortening out any machine with the slightest touch. The latter is actually useful in several adventures.

 

He is the master of a giant company called Gazer Konzern and the boss of mega-crime organization Nightmare. He is the master of the Lost Ship Dark Star, and intends to control the whole universe. Stargazer possesses a power to destroy the mind of a person from afar.

 

He is a young-looking guy who works for Stargazer, and master of Goln-Nova, one of the legendary Lost Ships. He commands Glen and Carly at Nightmare. He was injured in the battle with Alice ten years ago and has since been in stasis. He woke up after sleeping for 87,016 hours in a capsule.

Media

Light novels
When the first novel of Lost Universe was released in 1992, it enjoyed moderate success. Kanzaka was already in negotiations for the Slayers anime.

Manga
A manga adaptation by Shoko Yoshinaka was published in Kadokawa Shoten's Monthly Dragon Junior magazine from December 1997 to November 2002 and was collected into four volumes.

Anime

Lost Universe ran for 26 episodes and was plagued with numerous production problems. Most notably, large amounts of the raw work for the first few episodes were destroyed in a studio fire and had to be quickly replaced, resulting in reduced quality for those episodes. It also ran during the Southeast Asian financial crisis of 1998, which severely limited budgets for anime series across all studios. A Lost Universe film was rumored in 1998, but was cancelled in favor of more Slayers films.

Lost Universe is distributed in North America by Enoki Films, and was originally licensed for American distribution by ADV Films, who released the series onto both dubbed and subtitled VHS tapes and bilingual DVD. Following ADV's bankruptcy in 2009, the rights to the anime have since transferred to Nozomi Entertainment who re-released the complete series in a new bilingual DVD box set. The entirety of the show's English dub can be streamed and watched for free on Nozomi Entertainment's YouTube channel.

The 4th episode entitled , which aired on April 24, 1998, was initially animated by a South Korean animation company, San Ho Studio. Because the studio had only basic reference sheets of the characters to go by, the results wound up being dismal in quality. that it was therefore later reworked for the Laserdisc releases, and the term "yashigani" would later be adopted by Japanese anime fans as a derogatory term for poor art and animation in anime. The San Ho depiction of that episode is no longer considered canon.

Reception

Further reading

References

External links
 Doga production website for Lost Universe 
 
 List of Lost Universe Characters (English page)

1992 Japanese novels
1998 anime television series debuts
ADV Films
Adventure anime and manga
Comedy anime and manga
Drama anime and manga
Fujimi Fantasia Bunko
Kadokawa Dwango franchises
Light novels
Science fiction anime and manga
Shōnen manga
Slayers
TV Tokyo original programming
Holography in television
Anime and manga based on light novels